The Elephant Show (from the second season onward, Sharon, Lois & Bram's Elephant Show) is a Canadian children's television series, starring children's entertainers Sharon, Lois & Bram and made for CBC Television. The series premiered on October 8, 1984 and ended on February 26, 1989, with a total of 65 episodes over the course of 5 seasons. The show also aired on Nickelodeon's Nick Jr. block in the United States.

Series overview

Episodes

Season 1 (1984)

Season 2 (1986)

Season 3 (1986)
From this season onwards, Elephant is a female character.

Season 4 (1987–88)

Season 5 (1988–89)
This season does not feature the three in live concert segments.

External links
 

Lists of Canadian children's television series episodes